Steve Duchesne (born June 30, 1965) is a Canadian former professional ice hockey defenceman who played in the National Hockey League with several teams from 1986 until 2002. He was a three-time NHL All-Star and was a member of the Stanley Cup champion Detroit Red Wings in 2002.

Playing career
Duchesne began his notable hockey career with the Drummondville Voltigeurs of the Quebec Major Junior Hockey League. Never drafted by an NHL team, he was signed as a free agent by the Los Angeles Kings on October 1, 1984. He played one season with the New Haven Nighthawks of the American Hockey League before becoming an NHL regular in 1986–87. In his rookie NHL season, he played well enough to be named to the NHL All-Rookie Team. It did not take Duchesne long to establish himself as an above average offensive defenceman. In the 1988–89 NHL season, he led all defensemen in shorthanded goals with 5.

Duchesne remained with the Kings until May 30, 1991, when he was traded to the Philadelphia Flyers in a deal that brought future Hall of Famer Jari Kurri to Los Angeles. Duchesne played one season in Philadelphia, before being involved in one of the biggest trades in NHL history, moving to the Quebec Nordiques with a package of several players and cash in the Eric Lindros trade. Although Duchesne set a career high with 82 points in Quebec, he was again traded after one season to the St. Louis Blues. He spent two seasons with the Blues before being acquired by the upstart Ottawa Senators. After two successful seasons with the Senators, in which he scored the goal that clinched the team's first ever playoff spot, he was traded back to the Blues for Igor Kravchuk due to financial considerations. Duchesne's journeyman status continued, as he returned to the Kings as a free agent after one season with the Blues. During his first season back with the Kings, he was traded to the Flyers at the trade deadline. Finally, after the 1998–99 season, Duchesne signed as a free agent with the Detroit Red Wings, where he would win the Stanley Cup in his final season, 2001–02.

Personal life
Duchesne now resides in Westlake, Texas with his wife and two children. He coaches the U18 Dallas Stars Midget Major AAA hockey team. He is a co-owner of the Allen Americans, a Central Hockey League team which began play in the 2009-10 season.

International play

Duchesne won gold and silver with Team Canada in two international tournaments.

Awards
QMJHL First All-Star Team (1985)
NHL All-Rookie Team (1987)
Played in NHL All-Star Game (1989, 1990, 1993)
Barry Ashbee Trophy (1992)
Stanley Cup Champion (2002)

Career statistics

Regular season and playoffs

International

See also
List of NHL players with 1000 games played

References
Total Hockey (Second Edition), Editor - Dan Diamond,

External links
 

1965 births
Canadian ice hockey defencemen
Detroit Red Wings players
Drummondville Voltigeurs players
Ice hockey people from Quebec
Living people
Los Angeles Kings players
National Hockey League All-Stars
Ottawa Senators players
People from Sept-Îles, Quebec
Philadelphia Flyers players
Quebec Nordiques players
St. Louis Blues players
Stanley Cup champions
Undrafted National Hockey League players